A partial solar eclipse occurred on September 12, 1931. A solar eclipse occurs when the Moon passes between Earth and the Sun, thereby totally or partly obscuring the image of the Sun for a viewer on Earth. A partial solar eclipse occurs in the polar regions of the Earth when the center of the Moon's shadow misses the Earth.

This was the 72nd and final event from Solar Saros 114. It started in 651 AD and ended in 1931.

Related eclipses

Solar eclipses 1931–1935

Metonic series

References

External links 

1931 9 12
1931 in science
September 1931 events